Marilyn Cochran Brown (born February 5, 1950) is a former World Cup alpine ski racer from the United States.

The eldest of four siblings of the "Skiing Cochrans" family of Richmond, Vermont, she became the first American to win a discipline championship in the World Cup, triumphing in giant slalom at age 19 in 1969. The next year, she won a bronze medal in the combined at the World Championships.

Racing career
Born in Burlington, Vermont, Cochran and her younger sister Barbara (b. 1951) joined the U.S. Ski Team in 1967. She made her World Cup debut at age 18 in March 1968, a month after the Winter Olympics, with a pair of top ten finishes at the season's final stop in Aspen, Colorado. Brother Bob (b. 1951) joined the men's "A team" for the 1970 season and the three siblings competed on the World Cup tour through the 1974 season.

Marilyn was a three-time U.S. national champion during her career.  In the 1969 season, she finished runner-up in the final five giant slalom races and won the World Cup season title. Cochran was the only American alpine racer with a World Cup season title until 1980, when Phil Mahre won the combined.  She won the bronze medal in the combined at the 1970 World Championships in Val Gardena, Italy. Sister Barbara was fourth in that competition, but won a silver in the slalom, where Marilyn was sixth.

Cochran won three World Cup races, two in giant slalom and one in slalom, and had 15 podiums and fifty top ten finishes. The first victory came in February 1971 close to home, in Quebec at Mont Ste. Anne, with sister Barbara as runner-up. She competed in all three events at the Winter Olympics in 1972 in Japan, but with disappointing results: 28th in downhill, 20th in giant slalom, and a fall in the first run of the slalom, the race won by her sister. At the World Championships in 1974 in Switzerland, Cochran finished eighth in giant slalom, and retired from international competition after the season.

Post-racing life
After her racing career, Cochran attended the University of Vermont in Burlington  and graduated in 1979. She married Chris Brown, an All-American racer at the university and later a professor of mechanical engineering at WPI.  Their son Roger Brown, a 2004 graduate of Dartmouth, was also an All-American. He was the 2002 NCAA slalom champion and competed on the U.S. Ski Team. Younger son Douglas Brown was captain of the ski team at St. Lawrence University, and graduated in 2009.

Cochran was inducted into the National Ski Hall of Fame in 1978. Sister Barbara (1976) and brother Bob (2010) are also members of the hall. Cochran also joined her siblings Barbara (2013) and Bob (2014) as members of the Vermont Sports Hall of Fame in 2014.

World Cup results

Season titles

Season standings

Points were only awarded for top ten finishes (see scoring system).

Race podiums
 3 wins - (1 GS, 2 SL)
 15 podiums (9 GS, 6 SL)

See also
Skiing Cochrans

References

External links
 
 Marilyn Cochran World Cup standings at the International Ski Federation
 
 
 U.S. Ski & Snowboard Hall of Fame – Marilyn Cochran – inducted 1978 
 University of Vermont Athletics Hall of Fame – Marilyn Cochran Brown – skiing – inducted 1989
Vermont Sports Hall of Fame - Marilyn Cochran - skiing - inducted 2014

Alpine skiers at the 1972 Winter Olympics
Olympic alpine skiers of the United States
FIS Alpine Ski World Cup champions
American female alpine skiers
Sportspeople from Burlington, Vermont
University of Vermont alumni
1950 births
Living people
21st-century American women